MAZ-7907 is a Soviet army 24X24 transporter erector launcher prototype for the SS-24 ICBM designed and developed by the Minsk Automobile Plant (MAZ) in Belarus.

On August 9, 1983 the Soviet government issued a decree on the establishment of the RT-23 Molodets ICBM. The projected road-mobile RT-23 system was named "Celina-2" and received the industrial index 15P162.

The first of two prototypes was assembled at MAZ in March 1985. The chassis had to be capable of transporting an RT-23 missile with a launch weight of 104.5 tons, a length of 22.6 m and a diameter of 2.4 m in a launch tube, and the launch support equipment.

The RT-23 was deployed as both a silo-based and rail-mobile missile, but the road-mobile version was cancelled.

At least one of the prototypes seems to have been used after the collapse of the USSR for transportation of bridge parts and ships. Their fate is unclear.  The split chassis can be seen on Google Maps images in 2020, which appears to show the location of the picture on the right dated 2019.

The length of the vehicle is 28.1 m; the width 4.1 m and height 4.4 m. Two 1250 hp Klimov GTD-1250TFM gas turbine engines (from the T-80 tank) power an electric generator that sends power via turbine-electric transmission to 30 kW electric traction motors located at each one of the 24 wheels. Independent hydropneumatic suspension is used for each wheel.

References 

Military trucks of the Soviet Union
Self-propelled rocket launchers
Missile launchers
Military vehicles introduced in the 1980s
MAZ trucks
All-wheel-drive vehicles
Gas turbine vehicles
Vehicles with wheel motors